Yayuk Basuki was the defending champion, but lost in the first round to Nicole Arendt.

Sabine Appelmans won the title by defeating Patty Fendick 6–7(5–7), 7–6(7–5), 6–2 in the final.

Seeds

Draw

Finals

Top half

Bottom half

References

External links
 Official results archive (ITF)
 Official resulta archive (WTA)

Singles
Volvo Women's Open - Singles
 in women's tennis